Ajdin Redžić may refer to:

 Ajdin Redžić (footballer, born 1989), Slovenian football striker
 Ajdin Redžić (footballer, born 1997), Bosnian-Herzegovinian football midfielder